The 1901 Tie Cup Final was the final match to decide the winner of the Tie Cup, the 2nd. edition of the international competition organised by the Argentine and Uruguayan Associations together. The final was contested by two Argentine sides, Alumni and Rosario A.C., from Buenos Aires and Rosario respectively.

Alumni played its first final while Rosario contested its second consecutive final. The match was held in the Lomas Athletic field in the suburb of Lomas de Zamora, on 25 August 1901. Alumni won 2–1 in extra time with goals by Spencer Leonard and Patricio Dillon, achieving its first Tie Cup trophy.

Qualified teams

Overview 
This edition was contested by 6 teams, 4 from Argentina and 2 from Uruguay. Playing in a single-elimination tournament, Belgrano defeated Lomas (4–0 in Quilmes AC), and  Uruguayan side CURCC in the semifinal (1–0 at Parque Central, Montevideo).

On the other hand, Rosario only played one match, qualifying for the final after thrashing Belgrano 6–2 at Plaza Jewell.

The final was played at the Lomas Athletic field in Lomas de Zamora, Greater Buenos Aires. The match lead a great expectation from supporters of both clubs, who arrived in a train run for the occasion by British railway company Ferrocarril del Sud. On 8 minutes Alumni's S. Leonard scored the first goal. After that, Rosario persistently attacked but their attempts were blocked by the Alumni backs. Nevertheless, in the second half Rosario forced a 1–1 draw when A. Robinson scored on 60'. As the match ended tied, an 30' extra time was played to determine a winner, but no goal was scored during that time. Therefore, a new extra time (20') was added to decide which team would be champion, with Patricio Dillon scoring the second goal that crowned Alumni as champion, after 140 minutes of play.

Match details

References

Football in Buenos Aires Province
T
t
t